The 2019–20 season was Al-Fateh's 11th consecutive season in the Pro League and their 62nd year in existence. The club participated in the Pro League and the King Cup.

The season covered the period from 1 July 2019 to 9 September 2020.

Players

Squad information

Out on loan

Transfers and loans

Transfers in

Loans in

Transfers out

Loans out

Pre-season and friendlies

Competitions

Overview

Saudi Professional League

League table

Results summary

Result round by round

Matches
The Professional League schedule was announced on 21 July 2019.

All times are local, AST (UTC+3).

King Cup

All times are local, AST (UTC+3).

Statistics

Appearances

Last updated on 9 September 2020.

|-
! colspan=10 style=background:#dcdcdc; text-align:center|Goalkeepers

|-
! colspan=10 style=background:#dcdcdc; text-align:center|Defenders

|-
! colspan=10 style=background:#dcdcdc; text-align:center|Midfielders

|-
! colspan=10 style=background:#dcdcdc; text-align:center|Forwards

|-
! colspan=18 style=background:#dcdcdc; text-align:center| Players sent out on loan this season

|-
! colspan=18 style=background:#dcdcdc; text-align:center| Player who made an appearance this season but have left the club

|}

Goalscorers

Last Updated: 9 September 2020

Clean sheets

Last Updated: 4 September 2020

References

External links

Al-Fateh SC seasons
Al-Fateh